Pseudotelphusa trinephela is a moth of the family Gelechiidae. It is found in Zimbabwe.

The wingspan is about 10 mm. The forewings are light grey, speckled with white and partially tinged ochreous towards the costal markings and with some scattered black raised scales. There is an elongate blackish spot on the base of the costa, finely connected on the costal edge with an irregular blackish antemedian blotch reaching half across the wing. Three or four blackish dots around this in the disc represent the stigmata. There is an oblong suffused blackish postmedian blotch on the costa, as well as some small black marginal dots around the apex. The hindwings are subhyaline pale bluish-grey, with a grey margin.

References

Moths described in 1929
Pseudotelphusa